The Frauen DFB-Pokal 1982–83 was the 3rd season of the cup competition, Germany's second-most important title in women's football. In the final which was held in Frankfurt on 8 May 1983 KBC Duisburg defeated FSV Frankfurt 3–0, thus claiming their first national title.

Participants

First round

Quarter-finals

Semi-finals

Final

See also 

 1982–83 DFB-Pokal men's competition

References 

Fra
DFB-Pokal Frauen seasons